The 2016–17 season was Oud-Heverlee Leuven's 15th competitive season in professional football and the team's first season at the second level following their second relegation from the Belgian Pro League. Following a poor start the team only won their first match near the end of September on matchday seven. The form continued and OH Leuven kept struggling all season to set a consistent string of decent performances despite pre-season hopes of immediately regaining promotion to the Belgian First Division A. The team ended 5th in the opening competition and when despite a good start in the closing competition the performance started dropping, threatening to cause the team to end in the bottom four, manager Emilio Ferrera was sacked and replaced with Dennis van Wijk. Van Wijk could not improve the results and his main task involved in avoiding relegation, in which the team succeeded only on the very last day of the competition in a won home match against direct competitors Lommel United.

On top of the lacklustre season regarding performances, the club also experienced a turbulent season regarding ownership and management: in September 2016, chairman Jimmy Houtput was alleged to have offered the club as a "conduit" to allow third-party companies to gain ownership of football players in England. Houtput claimed he was "merely trying to obtain the identity of the possible investor(s) and would never take part in illegal activities to circumvent the third-party ownership", but subsequently resigned as OH Leuven chairman on 30 September. Chris Vandebroeck stepped in as care-taking chairman but has not been replaced since. In February 2017, Vandebroeck announced that the team had formed a pre-agreement with a Chinese investment company to perform a takeover of OH Leuven, stating that following the relegation a financial injection was needed to remain competitive. In reaction to a wave of criticism from supporters that the club would be sold to foreign investors, a group of supporters created a project called "OHL op Dreef" which managed to find a group of Flemish investors and entrepreneurs from the Leuven region willing to invest in the club. The group finally made a counter-offer and in the months that followed it became clear that the Chinese investment group was not following up on their commitments and would be backing out the investment. This seemed to give the Flemish investors the leading edge, but surprisingly, OH Leuven announced early May they had again signed a new pre-agreement, but now with a set of Thai investors, more specifically the King Power International Group led by Vichai Srivaddhanaprabha who already owns Leicester City. Vichai's son Aiyawatt Srivaddhanaprabha would become CEO of OH Leuven.

2016–17 squad
This section lists players who were in Oud-Heveree Leuven's first team squad at any point during the 2016–17 season
The symbol § indicates player left mid-season
The symbol # indicates player joined mid-season
The symbol ¥ indicates a youngster who has appeared on the match sheet at least once during the season (possibly as unused substitute)
Italics indicate loan player

Transfers

The first transfer was announced already in March 2016, when it was released that second goalkeeper Yves Lenaerts had signed for ASV Geel in search for more playing opportunity. This proved to be just the first outgoing transfer of many, as following the relegation from the Belgian Pro League on 13 March 2016, several players left the team: Brazilian defender Kanu saw his contract terminated by mutual consent just a few days after the relegation, over the summer three key players were sold, namely John Bostock (to Lens), Yohan Croizet (to Mechelen) and Jordan Remacle (to Antwerp). The loan deals of Samuel Asamoah, Charni Ekangamene, Leandro Trossard, Slobodan Urošević and Oleksandr Volovyk were not extended, youngster Konstantinos Rougalas was allowed to leave the club and return to Greece  and the contracts of Frenchmen Jean Calvé and Rudy Riou, striker Kim Ojo and defender Kenny Van Hoevelen were either terminated or not prolonged. Yohan Brouckaert and Kenneth Van Goethem were out on loan during the 2015–16 season and both signed for new teams, Brouckaert moved to RWDM47 while Kenneth Van Goethem moved to Aarschot. Other outgoing transfers included substitute strikers Alessandro Cerigioni and Romero Regales, respectively moving to Waasland-Beveren and Den Bosch.

At this point, the only remaining players were goalkeeper Gillekens, defenders Delporte, Ngawa and Reynaud, midfielders Le Postollec and Lokando and strikers Azevedo, Kostovski and Sula, not even enough for a complete lineup. The first additions arrived early June, as OH Leuven announced the contract extensions of Kenneth Houdret and Pieterjan Monteyne, while youngster Simon Bracke returned from loan to ASV Geel and was added to the squad. Later that month, the first new names were signed with defender Fazlı Kocabaş (from Union SG) and striker Esteban Casagolda (from Dender EH). OH Leuven then again announced some familiar names, first with the return of winger Ben Yagan who had been released in the summer of 2015 but had experienced a strong season at Heist, followed by the surprise signing of experienced defender and OH Leuven youth product Jeroen Simaeys from Krylia Sovetov. Later in the month of July, the team confirmed the loan deal of winger Serge Tabekou, arriving from Gent.

Early August saw three newcomers added to the team, the signings of Soufiane El Banouhi (from WS Brussels) and Jonathan Kindermans (from Waalwijk) were not unexpected as both had been training with the team for several weeks already. Finally experienced defender Cédric D'Ulivo was also added to the team, coming over from Zulte Waregem. Towards the end of the summer 2016 transfer window, goalkeeper Ram Strauss was brought in from Poli Timișoara as a substitute for Gillekens  and on transfer deadline day itself OHL loaned two players to complete the squad, with Yannick Loemba and Nathan de Medina coming over respectively from Oostende and Anderlecht.

During the 2016–17 winter transfer window, OHL first released two players near the end of 2016 by terminating by mutual consent the contracts of youngster Tuur Houben and only recently acquired goalkeeper Ram Strauss. To replace Strauss as second keeper, free agent player Laurent Henkinet was signed, after which followed the signings of youngsters Leo Njengo (from Dessel Sport) and Nikola Storm (on loan from Club Brugge). Finally on 31 January 2016, the last day of the winter transfer window, OHL loaned two players from Gent: midfielder Lucas Schoofs and defender Siebe Horemans.

Transfers In

Transfers Out

Pre-season

Belgian First Division B

OHL's first season in the Belgian First Division B began on 7 August 2016.

Results

Opening Competition

Closing Competition

Relegation play-offs

Belgian Cup

Results

Footnotes

References

External links
 

2016-17
Belgian football clubs 2016–17 season
Oud-Heverlee Leuven seasons